The 2019 Chinese Football Association Division Two League season is the 30th season since its establishment in 1989. The league was expanded to 32 teams, with 16 teams in North Group and 16 teams in South Group.

Team changes

To League Two
Team relegated from 2018 China League One
 Zhejiang Yiteng
 Dalian Transcendence

Teams promoted from 2018 Chinese Champions League
 Taizhou Yuanda
 Chengdu Better City
 Hubei Chufeng United
 Hangzhou Wuyue Qiantang
 Lhasa Urban Construction Investment
 Nanjing Shaye
 Shanxi Metropolis
 Yunnan Kunlu
 Wuhan Shangwen
 Guangxi Baoyun
 Qingdao Red Lions
 Xi'an Daxing Chongde
 Shenzhen Xinqiao (withdrew)
 Heilongjiang Crane City

From League Two
Teams promoted to 2019 China League One
 Sichuan Longfor
 Nantong Zhiyun
 Shaanxi Chang'an Athletic

Dissolved entries
 Anhui Hefei Guiguan
 Hainan Boying
 Shanghai Sunfun
 Shenyang Dongjin
 Shenzhen Ledman
 Yunnan Flying Tigers

Name changes
 Zhenjiang Huasa F.C. moved to Kunshan and changed their name to Kunshan F.C. in December 2018.
 Baotou Nanjiao F.C. changed their name to Inner Mongolia Caoshangfei F.C. in January 2019.
 Wuhan Shangwen F.C. changed their name to Wuhan Three Towns F.C. in January 2019.
 Dalian Boyoung F.C. changed their name to Dalian Chanjoy F.C. in January 2019.
 Zibo Sunday F.C. changed their name to Zibo Cuju F.C. in January 2019.
 Hebei Elite F.C. changed their name to Hebei Aoli Jingying F.C. in February 2019.

Clubs

Stadiums and Locations

Clubs Locations

Managerial changes

League tables

North Group

South Group

Overall table

Play-offs

Championship play-offs

Promotion play-offs

3rd-6th place

3rd-4th place
The winner will be directly promoted to 2020 China League One while the loser will participate in the Relegation play-offs.

5th-6th place
The winner will participate in the Relegation play-offs.

7th–8th place

9th–10th place

11th–12th place

13th–14th place

15th–16th place

17th–18th place

19th–20th place

21st–22nd place

23rd–24th place

25th–26th place

Relegation play-offs

27th-30th place

Relegation

Results

North Group

South Group

Results by match played

North Group

South Group

Top scorers

Source:

Awards
The awards of 2019 China League Two were announced on 4 December 2019.

League attendance

References

External links

3
China League Two seasons